Willy Tschopp (3 September 1905 – 5 November 1987) was a Swiss sprinter. He competed in the men's 100 metres at the 1928 Summer Olympics.

References

1905 births
1987 deaths
Athletes (track and field) at the 1928 Summer Olympics
Swiss male sprinters
Olympic athletes of Switzerland
Place of birth missing